This is a list of compact disc albums with tracks hidden in the pregap of the first track.

See also
 List of albums containing a hidden track
 Lists of albums

References

 Pregap